The Russian Far East is a region in Northeast Asia. It is the easternmost part of Russia and the Asian continent; and is administered as part of the Far Eastern Federal District, which is located between Lake Baikal in eastern Siberia and the Pacific Ocean. The area's largest city is Khabarovsk, followed by Vladivostok. The region shares land borders with the countries of Mongolia, China, and North Korea to its south, as well as maritime boundaries with Japan to its southeast, and with the United States along the Bering Strait to its northeast. 

Although the Russian Far East is often considered as a part of Siberia abroad, it has been historically categorized separately from Siberia in Russian regional schemes (and previously during the Soviet era when it was called the Soviet Far East).

Terminology
In Russia, the region is usually referred to as just "Far East". What is known in English as the Far East is usually referred to as "the Asia-Pacific Region" (abbreviated to ), or "East Asia", depending on the context.

Geographical features

Beyenchime-Salaatin crater
Klyuchevskaya Sopka volcano
Kuril–Kamchatka Trench
Lake Baikal

Fauna

Order Galliformes

Family Tetraonidae 

 Hazel grouse
 Siberian grouse
 Black grouse
 Black-billed capercaillie
 Willow ptarmigan
 Rock ptarmigan

Family Phasianidae 

 Daurian partridge
 Japanese quail
 Ring-necked pheasant

Order Artiodactyla 
 Sika deer
 Snow sheep
 Caribou
 Elk
 Wild boar
 Siberian roe deer
 Manchurian wapiti
 Siberian musk deer

Order Carnivora

Family Canidae 

 Eurasian wolf
 Tundra wolf
 Arctic fox
 Red fox

Family Felidae
 Amur leopard
 Siberian tiger

Family Ursidae
 Ussuri black bear
 Eurasian brown bear
 East Siberian brown bear
 Kamchatka brown bear
 Ussuri brown bear
 Polar bear

Flora
 Picea obovata
 Pinus pumila
 Alnus japonica

History

Russian expansion

Russians reached the Pacific coast in 1647 with the establishment of Okhotsk, and the Russian Empire consolidated its control over the Russian Far East in the 19th century, after the annexation of part of Chinese Manchuria (1858-1860). Primorskaya Oblast was established as a separate administrative division of the Russian Empire in 1856, with its administrative center at Khabarovsk.

Administrative history 
Several entities with the name "Far East" existed in the first half of the 20th century, all with rather different boundaries:
 1920–1922: the Far Eastern Republic, which included Transbaikal, Amur, Primorskaya, and Kamchatka Oblasts and northern Sakhalin;
 1922–1926: , which included Amur, Transbaikal and Kamchatka Guberniyas and others;
 1926–1938: Far-Eastern Krai, which included the present-day Primorsky and Khabarovsk Krais.

Until 2000 the Russian Far East lacked officially-defined boundaries.  A single term "Siberia and the Far East" often referred to Russia's regions east of the Urals without drawing a clear distinction between "Siberia" and "the Far East".

In 2000 Russia's federal subjects were grouped into larger federal districts, one of which, the Far Eastern Federal District, comprised Amur Oblast, the Chukotka Autonomous Okrug, the Jewish Autonomous Oblast, Kamchatka Oblast with the Koryak Autonomous Okrug, Khabarovsk Krai, Magadan Oblast, Primorsky Krai, the Sakha (Yakutia) Republic, and Sakhalin Oblast. In November 2018 Zabaykalsky Krai and the Republic of Buryatia were added they had previously formed part of the Siberian Federal District. Since 2000, Russians have increasingly used the term "Far East" to refer to the federal district, though the term is often also used more loosely.

Defined by the boundaries of the federal district, the Far East has an area of —over one-third of Russia's total area.

Russo-Japanese War

Russia in the early 1900s persistently sought a warm-water port on the Pacific Ocean for the Imperial Russian Navy as well as to facilitate maritime trade. The recently-established Pacific seaport of Vladivostok (founded in 1860) was operational only during the summer season, but Port Arthur (leased by Russia from China from 1896 onwards) in Manchuria could operate all year. After the First Sino-Japanese War (1894-1895) and the failure of the 1903 negotiations between Japan and the Tsar Nicholas II's government, Japan chose war to protect its domination of Korea and adjacent territories. Russia, meanwhile, saw war as a means of distracting its populace from government repression and of rallying patriotism in the aftermath of several general strikes. Japan issued a declaration of war on 8 February 1904. However, three hours before Japan's declaration of war was received by the Russian government, the Imperial Japanese Navy attacked the Russian 1st Pacific Squadron at Port Arthur. Eight days later Russia declared war on Japan.

The war ended in September 1905 with a Japanese victory following the fall of Port Arthur and the failed Russian invasion of Japan through the Korean Peninsula and Northeast China; also, Japan had threatened to invade Primorsky Krai via Korea. The warring parties signed the Treaty of Portsmouth on 5 September 1905, and both Japan and Russia agreed to evacuate Manchuria and to return its sovereignty to China, but Japan was allowed to lease the Liaodong Peninsula (containing Port Arthur and Talien, aka Kwantung Leased Territory), and the Russian rail system in southern Manchuria with its access to strategic resources. Japan also received the southern half of the island of Sakhalin from Russia. In 1907 Japan forced Russia to confiscate land from Korean settlers (who formed the majority of Primorsky Krai's population) due to a fear of an invasion of Korea and of the ousting of Japanese troops by Korean guerrillas.

Soviet era

Between 1937 and 1939, the Soviet Union under Joseph Stalin deported over 200,000 Koreans to Uzbekistan and Kazakhstan, fearing that the Koreans might act as spies for Japan. Many Koreans died on the way in cattle trains due to starvation, illness, or freezing conditions. Soviet authorities purged and executed many community leaders; Koryo-saram were not allowed to travel outside of Central Asia for the next 15 years. Koreans were also not allowed to use the Korean language and its use began to become lost with the involvement of the Koryo-mar dialect and the use of Russian.

Development of numerous remote locations in the Soviet Far East relied on Gulag labour camps during Stalin's rule, especially in the region's northern half. After the death of Stalin in 1953 the large-scale use of forced labour waned and was superseded by volunteer employees attracted by relatively high wages.

Soviet–Japanese conflicts

During the Japanese invasion of Manchuria in 1931, the Soviets occupied Bolshoy Ussuriysky Island, Yinlong Island, and several adjacent islets to separate the city of Khabarovsk from the territory controlled by a possibly hostile power.

Indeed, Japan turned its military attention to Soviet territories. Conflicts between the Japanese and the Soviets frequently happened on the border of Manchuria between 1938 and 1945. The first confrontation occurred in Primorsky Krai, the Battle of Lake Khasan (July–August 1938) involved an attempted military incursion of Japanese-controlled Manchukuo into territory claimed by the Soviet Union. This incursion was founded in the beliefs of the Japanese side that the Soviet Union had misinterpreted the demarcation of the boundary based on the 1860 Treaty of Peking between Imperial Russia and Manchu China. Primorsky Krai was always threatened by a Japanese invasion despite the fact that most of the remaining clashes occurred in Manchukuo.

The clashes ended shortly before and after the conclusion of World War II (see Soviet–Japanese War) when a war-weakened Japan found its territories of Manchukuo, Mengjiang, Korea, and South Sakhalin invaded by Soviet and Mongolian troops (August 1945).

World War II

Both the Soviet Union and Japan regarded the Primorsky Krai as a strategic location in World War II, and clashes over the territory were common. The Soviets and the other Allies considered it a key location for the planned invasion of Japan through Korea; Japan viewed it as a key location to begin a mass invasion of Eastern Russia. The Primorsky Krai served as the Soviet Union's Pacific headquarters in the war to plan an invasion for allied troops of Korea in order to reach Japan.

After the Soviet invasion, the USSR returned Manchukuo and Mengjiang to China; Korea became liberated. The Soviet Union also occupied and annexed the Kuril Islands and southern Sakhalin. The planned Soviet invasion of Japan proper never happened.

Cold War
During the Korean War, Primorsky Krai became the site of extreme security concern for the Soviet Union.

Vladivostok became the site of the Strategic Arms Limitation Talks in 1974. At the time, the Soviet Union and the United States decided quantitative limits on various nuclear weapons systems and banned the construction of new land-based ICBM launchers. Vladivostok and other cities in Primorsky Krai soon became closed cities because of the bases of the Soviet Pacific Fleet.

Incursions of American reconnaissance aircraft from Alaska sometimes happened. Concerns of the Soviet military caused the infamous Korean Air Lines Flight 007 incident in 1983.

Russian Federation

Russian Homestead Act
In 2016, President Vladimir Putin proposed the Russian Homestead Act to populate the Russian Far East.

Demographics

Population

According to the 2010 Census, Far Eastern Federal District had a population of 6,293,129.
Most of it is concentrated in the southern parts.  Given the vast territory of the Russian Far East, 6.3 million people translates to slightly less than one person per square kilometer, making the Russian Far East one of the most sparsely populated areas in the world.  The population of the Russian Far East has been rapidly declining since the dissolution of the Soviet Union (even more so than for Russia in general), dropping by 14% in the last fifteen years.  The Russian government had been discussing a range of re-population programs to avoid the forecast drop to 4.5 million people by 2015, hoping to attract in particular the remaining Russian population of the near abroad but eventually agreeing on a program to resettle Ukrainian Illegal immigrants.

Ethnic Russians and Ukrainians make up the majority of the population.

Cities
75% of the population is urban.  The largest cities are:

Vladivostok
Khabarovsk
Ulan-Ude
Chita
Komsomolsk-on-Amur
Blagoveshchensk
Yakutsk
Petropavlovsk-Kamchatsky
Yuzhno-Sakhalinsk
Nakhodka
Ussuriysk

Traditional ethnic groups
The original population groups of the Russian Far East include (grouped by language group):
Mongolic: Buryats
Turkic: Sakha
Eskimo–Aleut: Aleuts, Siberian Yupiks (Yuits)
Chukotko-Kamchatkan: Chukchi, Koryaks, Alutors, Kereks, Itelmens
Tungusic: Evenks, Evens, Nanais, Orochs, Ul'ch, Udegey, Orok, Manchus
Isolate: Yukaghirs, Nivkhs, Ainus

Transportation

The region was not connected with the rest of Russia via domestic highways until the M58 highway was completed in 2010.

Uniquely for Russia, most cars have right-hand drive (73% of all cars in the region), though traffic still flows on the right-hand side of the road.

Railways are better developed. The Trans-Siberian Railway and Baikal–Amur Mainline (since 1984) provide a connection with Siberia (and the rest of the country). The Amur–Yakutsk Mainline is aimed to link the city of Yakutsk to the Russian railway network. Passenger trains connect to Nizhny Bestyakh as of 2013.

Like in nearby Siberia, for many remote localities, aviation is the main mode of transportation to/from civilisation, but the infrastructure is often poor.

Maritime transport is also important for delivering supplies to localities at (or near) the Pacific and Arctic coasts.

See also 

 Bering Strait
 Far North (Russia)
 Kolyma
 List of Russian explorers
 Outer Manchuria

Footnotes

Bibliography
 Beer, Daniel. The house of the dead: Siberian exile under the tsars (Vintage, 2017).
 Bobrick, Benson/ East of the Sun: the Epic Conquest and Tragic History of Siberia, (NY: Poseidon Press, 1992) 
 Forsyth, James. History of the Peoples of Siberia, (Cambridge: University Press 1992)
 Glebov, Sergei. "Center, Periphery, and Diversity in the Late Imperial Far East: New Historiography of a Russian Region." Ab Imperio 2019.3 (2019): 265–278.
 Hartley, Janet M. Siberia, A History of the People, (New Haven: Yale University Press 2014) 
 Haywood, A.J. Siberia: A Cultural History, (Oxford UP, 2010)
 Monahan, Erika. The merchants of Siberia: Trade in early modern Eurasia (Cornell UP, 2016).
 Naumov, Igor. History of Siberia, (London: Routledge, 2006)
 Reid, Anna. The Shaman's Coat: A Native History of Siberia, (NY: Walker & Comp., 2002)
 Stolberg. Eva-Maria  (ed.), Siberian Saga: a History of Russia's Wild East, (2005)
 Vajda (ed.),  Edward J.Languages and Prehistory of Central Siberia, (Philadelphia: John Benjamins, 2004)
 Wood, Alan. The History of Siberia, (London: Rutledge, 1991)
 Wood, Alan.   Russian Far East 1581 -1991, (London:  Bloomsbury Academic, 2011)

External links

 Meeting of Frontiers: Siberia, Alaska, and the American West (includes materials on Russian Far East)
 Дальневосточный федеральный округ at WGEO

 
North Asia
Regions of Russia
Historical regions